Tamara Luke (born 22 February 1988) is an Australian rules footballer who plays for the Hawthorn Football Club in the AFL Women's (AFLW). She has played for Hawthorn's VFLW team. In March 2021, she was delisted by St Kilda.

Statistics 
Updated to the end of S7 (2022).

|-
| 2020 ||  || 22
| 1 || 0 || 0 || 7 || 3 || 10 || 3 || 1 || 1 || 0.0 || 0.0 || 7.0 || 3.0 || 10.0 || 3.0 || 1.0 || 1.0 || 0
|-
| 2021 ||  || 22
| 5 || 1 || 1 || 15 || 5 || 20 || 7 || 9 || 30 || 0.2 || 0.2 || 3.0 || 1.0 || 4.0 || 1.4 || 1.8 || 6.0 || 0
|-
| S7 (2022) ||  || 22
| 2 || 0 || 0 || 8 || 1 || 9 || 3 || 3 || 17 || 0.0 || 0.0 || 4.0 || 0.5 || 4.5 || 1.5 || 1.5 || 8.5 || 0
|- class="sortbottom"
! colspan=3| Career
! 8 !! 1 !! 1 !! 30 !! 9 !! 39 !! 13 !! 13 !! 48 !! 0.1 !! 0.1 !! 3.8 !! 1.1 !! 4.9 !! 1.6 !! 1.6 !! 6.0 !! 0
|}

Honours and achievements 
  best club person: S7 (2022)

References

External links

 

Living people
1988 births
St Kilda Football Club (AFLW) players
Australian rules footballers from Victoria (Australia)
Sportswomen from Victoria (Australia)
Australian netball players
Melbourne Kestrels players
Netball players from Victoria (Australia)
Hawthorn Football Club (AFLW) players